Thomas Drennan (1696–1768) was an Irish Presbyterian minister active in advocating political and religious reforms.

Drennan graduated from the University of Glasgow, and served as Presbyterian minister in Holywood and in First Presbyterian Church, Belfast, where he was installed in 1736 as a colleague of Samuel Haliday. He became sole minister of the congregation following Hailday's death in 1739. He was one of several Irish reformers who influenced Scottish Enlightenment philosopher Francis Hutcheson, during the latter's time as master of an academy in Dublin. Drennan's son, William Drennan, would become a famous physician, poet, and political radical. His daughter, Martha, married the United Irishman Samuel McTier. James Crombie became one of the ministers of First Presbyterian Church, Belfast following Drennan's death

References
 

 

1696 births
1768 deaths
18th-century Presbyterian ministers
Alumni of the University of Glasgow
Irish non-subscribing Presbyterian ministers